The Maggie L. Walker Governor's School for Government and International Studies (MLWGSGIS) is a public regional magnet high school in Richmond, Virginia.

One of the 18 Virginia Governor's Schools, it draws students from 14 jurisdictions: the counties of Chesterfield, Henrico, Hanover, Goochland, Powhatan, Prince George, Charles City, King and Queen,  New Kent and Dinwiddie, and the cities of Richmond,  Petersburg, Hopewell, and Colonial Heights. As the Governor's School for Government and International Studies, it shared space at Thomas Jefferson High School (TJHS) in the city's West End from its 1991 founding until summer 2001, when it moved into Maggie L. Walker High School after massive renovations. Every year since 2006 the school was recognized by Newsweek as one of the twenty-one most elite public schools in America. In 2013, Maggie Walker was ranked 14th in Newsweek's "Best Public High Schools"  In 2014, Maggie Walker was ranked 10th in The Daily Beast's "Best High Schools" and 7th in their "25 Best High Schools in the South."

Applying
Applicants undergo an application process in which assessment materials and essay prompts are administered. A combination of grades, recommendations, and test results determine the applicants' overall score. All applicants must have completed and passed at least Algebra I or an equivalent math course. It is also recommended that students have completed Honors English, Earth and Life Sciences, and at least one year of a foreign language, but this is not required. Overall, about 16-17% of applicants are accepted into MLWGSGIS out of a pool of around 1200 applicants from all the participating localities, making the freshmen class usually around 190 students. The school grades the applications, but it is the applicant's home school district that decides who is allowed to attend the school based on scores and available funding.

Organization
Each city or county that wishes to send students to the Governor's School must fund the school for the students that they send, as well as provide busing to and from the school. While the Governor's School allows allotments for each locality that cannot be exceeded, it is the individual localities that ultimately determine their own limit on how many students can be sent within the parameters of the allotment given and available funding. The Regional School Board of the Governor's School that oversees the administration comprises one school board member from each of the participating localities.

History
At its 1991 founding, the Governor's School for Government and International Studies was given the Thomas Jefferson High School building to share by Richmond Public Schools.  The city school stopped accepting freshmen in 1991, intending to turn the building fully over to GSGIS by 1995.  However, parents, students, and alumni of TJHS, as well as city politicians, protested the closing of their school, RPS reversed its decision, and in 1992 TJ started accepting freshmen again and GSGIS started looking for a permanent home.

After several years of false starts and administrative turnover, GSGIS finally obtained the Maggie Walker High School building, an abandoned former Richmond City school, as a permanent home.  The original building, Maggie L. Walker High School, was first opened in the 1930s as a school for African-Americans.  It was named for Maggie Lena Walker, the first woman and African-American to operate a bank in the United States and was once attended by American civil rights lawyer and politician Henry L. Marsh, African American tennis pro Arthur Ashe, as well as pro football Hall-of-Famer Willie Lanier, and NBA great Bob Dandridge.  GSGIS took up occupancy in fall 2001 after several million dollars of renovations and adopted the name Maggie L. Walker Governor's School for Government and International Studies, or MLWGSGIS for short, though commonly shortened further to MLWGS.

Academics
Today, MLWGSGIS is known for its challenging academic curriculum and performance in national and regional academic competitions. Large numbers of graduating seniors at the Governor's School seniors are accepted into highly ranked universities.

Community service
To foster community improvement efforts, all Governor's School students are required to complete 140 hours of community service by graduation. School clubs frequently participate in neighborhood cleanup projects. In order to receive a Governor's School diploma, all community service and credits must be completed. The 2008 graduating class completed over 34,500 community service hours.

Athletics
MLWGSGIS competes the Colonial District grouping with other greater Richmond area schools, and in statewide competition as part of Region B in group Class 3 Virginia High School League.  Previously the school was in VHSL Class 2 but at the end of the 2019 season was moved up to Class 3 due to a growing student population. The school fields teams in basketball, dance, volleyball, wrestling, soccer, tennis, golf, swimming, field hockey, cross-country, indoor and outdoor track and field, baseball, and softball; only football is omitted from the offerings of a traditional public high school.  The school mascot is the Green Dragon, adopted from the former Maggie L. Walker High School. In 2001, the boys' cross country team won the state AAA championship, led to victory by head coach Jim Holdren.  In 2010, the Maggie Walker girls' cross country team became the state runner-up in the AAA championship. In 2019, the Maggie Walker Cross country boys team placed third while the girls team won the 2019 cross country AAA State Competition in their respective groups. In 2006, 2007, 2008, 2010, and 2011 the field hockey team won the colonial district championship. In 2008 the team was the central region runner-up to rival Thomas Dale, which qualified the team to go to states for the first time in 3 years. In 2010 and 2011 the team won the Central Region Championship and once again played in the State Tournament.  In 2013-14 The Boys' and Girls' Cross Country Teams won first place in their respective AA sections and so did the Boys' and Girls' indoor Track teams.  The Boys' Outdoor Track team also won First in that season. Also, the Girls' Swim team won their section in 2013–14. In 2015–2016, the Baseball team finished in 3rd at the AA state tournament to go along with a team record 17 wins, while the Girls' Soccer team finished 2nd. Swim team again won VHSL championships in 2017, this time both in the Boys' and Girls' categories. In 2017, the Baseball team captured the AA state crown, defeating rival Goochland 3–1. In 2017, Boys' soccer won the school's first VHSL 2A Boys' Soccer State Championship, ending the season on a dominant 9 game winning streak that firmly asserted the program's spot in the top-tier of the Richmond area soccer.

Dual enrollment
MLWGSGIS is in a partnership with Virginia Commonwealth University (VCU), meaning that students can earn college credit for certain "dual enrollment" high school classes.  This also allows MLWGSGIS students access to VCU's library system.

Alumni

Bob Dandridge '65, professional basketball player
Emmanuel Pratt '95, urban designer & 2019 MacArthur Fellow
Sara Schaefer '96, Emmy award-winning writer and comedian
Colin Van Ostern '96, politician
Mohammad Alavi (game developer) '98
Jenny Han '98, New York Times bestselling author
Jillian Johnson '99, Mayor Pro Tempore for the City of Durham, North Carolina
Jamey Stegmaier '99, founder of Stonemaier Games and designer of Scythe (board game)
Esther Erb '04, long-distance runner
Marguerite Bennett '06, comic book writer
Will Roberts '08, former minor league baseball pitcher
Cheta Emba '11, rugby union player
Lucy Dacus '13, musician

See also
Appomattox Regional Governor's School for the Arts And Technology
 Governor's Schools (Virginia)
 N. Douglas Hunt, school Director from 2002 to the Spring of 2009.
 Virginia High School League (Athletics)
Jim Holdren, cross country head coach.

Notes
 This number is calculated by dividing the 2017-2018 enrollment of 751 by 4 for an average class size of about 188, then dividing that number into the same year's applicant pool of 1160 to get a percentage between 16 and 17 percent.

References

External links

School buildings on the National Register of Historic Places in Virginia
Public high schools in Virginia
Art Deco architecture in Virginia
School buildings completed in 1938
Magnet schools in Virginia
NCSSS schools
High schools in Richmond, Virginia
National Register of Historic Places in Richmond, Virginia
Historically segregated African-American schools in Virginia
Educational institutions established in 1991
1991 establishments in Virginia